Daymaro Amador Salina (born 1 September 1987) is a Cuban-born Portuguese handballer for FC Porto and the Portuguese national team.

He represented Portugal at the 2020 European Men's Handball Championship.

Honours
Porto
Portuguese League: 2011–12, 2012–13, 2013–14, 2014–15, 2018–19, 2020–21
Portuguese Cup: 2018–19, 2020–21
Portuguese Super Cup: 2014, 2019, 2021

References

External links

Portuguese male handball players
1987 births
People from Artemisa
Living people
FC Porto handball players
Handball players at the 2020 Summer Olympics

Portuguese people of Cuban descent